Winchcombe railway station is a heritage railway station which serves the town of Winchcombe in Gloucestershire, England. The stations itself is actually located in the nearby village of Greet. The station closed to passengers in 1960, although the line itself remained open for freight and diversionary use until 1976, when a freight train derailed near Winchcombe and damaged the track.

By the late 1970s, the line had been dismantled. Nearby is the  Greet Tunnel, the second longest on any preserved line in Britain.

History 
The OW&W became the West Midland Railway in 1860 and was acquired by Great Western Railway in 1883 with a view to combining it with the Birmingham to Stratford Line to create a high-speed route from the Midlands to the South West. The GWR obtained authorisation in 1899 for the construction of a double-track line between Honeybourne and Cheltenham and this was completed in stages by 1908.

Winchcombe was opened on 1 February 1905. It is situated close to the small village of Greet but  to the north of Winchcombe. Two  facing platforms were provided; the original station building built of red brick on a plinth of blue brick was situated on the Down platform. On the Up platform was a passenger waiting shelter and gentlemen's lavatory. The goods yard lay on the south-eastern side of the station and comprised cattle pens, a goods shed, weighbridge  and 6-ton crane. A brick-built 31-lever signal box controlled access to the yard, while a 50-wagon Up refuge siding led to the rear of the Up platform.

From February 1905 to June 1906, Winchcombe was the southern terminus of the line and buses to Cheltenham were provided pending the extension south. By 1938, nine Down and ten Up services ran daily, with three on Sundays. Traffic receipts for 1913 showed that 21,824 passengers had been carried, representing £1,436 in fares collected (equivalent to £ in ), whilst 11,828 tons of goods traffic had been handled (mainly coal/coke and livestock), giving a total income of £5,837 (equivalent to £ in ). By 1933, both of these figures had fallen: receipts to £4,436 (equivalent to £ in ) and goods tonnage to 8,320. The Second World War however saw tonnage peak at 17,045, with the bulk of it consisting in agricultural machinery, fertilisers and foodstuffs.

Winchcombe closed to passenger traffic on 7 March 1960, the distance between the town and its station contributing to its demise. The goods yard remained open for a further four years until 2 November 1964. By March 1965, the station site had been levelled, leaving only the weighhouse, goods shed and residential accommodation. The signal box remained in operation until 24 February 1965, shortly after which it was demolished. The line remained open to goods and diversionary traffic until 25 August 1976 when the 06.35 Toton to  derailed at a point east of the bridge carrying the B4632 road linking Winchcombe and Toddington over the line. The incident prompted British Rail to announce the line's closure.

Stationmasters

William Joseph Edwards 1905   - ca. 1911 (formerly station master at Leckhampton)
Mr. Price from 1915 (afterwards station master at Bourton on the Water)
William Henry Rabjohns ca. 1923
Percy William Tow ca. 1928
W. Williams ca. 1928 - 1932 (afterwards station master at Chipping Norton)
Mr. Jilkes from 1932
S. Woodward 1940 - 1946 (afterwards station master at Moreton-in-Marsh)
William Maurice Jennings 1946 - 1952 (afterwards station master at Littleton and Badsey)

Present day

The Gloucestershire Warwickshire Railway reopened the line between Toddington and Winchcombe on 2 August 1987. The only original buildings left are the old goods shed, now the main workshop for the carriage and wagon group on the railway, and the weighbridge. Bidirectional signalling has been installed as has a passing loop through the station, which has been operational since 12 July 1997. Since 2012, the station, and indeed parts of the line itself, have been used for scenes in the television series Father Brown.

References

Sources

 
 
 

 

Heritage railway stations in Gloucestershire
Former Great Western Railway stations
Railway stations in Great Britain opened in 1905
Railway stations in Great Britain closed in 1960
Railway stations in Great Britain opened in 1987
Winchcombe